The Continental Circus Berlin is a touring circus featured in the UK and presented by the European Entertainment Corporation during the summertime.

The Continental Circus Berlin also goes under the shortened name of Circus Berlin.

The Circus usually consists of 20-30 cast members, which include clowns, acrobats, tightrope walkers, and other circus artists.

The Circus is operated by the same organization that presents the Moscow State Circus.

See also
Moscow State Circus

External links
Continental Circus Berlin Website
Images of Continental Circus Berlin 2009

Circuses